Conger erebennus is an eel in the family Congridae (conger/garden eels). It was described by David Starr Jordan and John Otterbein Snyder in 1901, originally under the genus Leptocephalus. It is a marine, temperate water-dwelling eel which is known from Japan and the Korean Peninsula, in the northwestern Pacific Ocean.
It is also called the "anaconda" アナコンダ ("marine anaconda") in Tokyo, Japan.

References

Conger
Fish of the Pacific Ocean
Fish of Japan
Fish of Korea
Taxa named by David Starr Jordan
Taxa named by John Otterbein Snyder
Fish described in 1901